Shower of Stars is an Australian television series which aired in 1959 on Sydney station ATN-7. It was a variety show with comedy and music, and regulars included Hal Lashwood, Syd Heylen, and Al Thomas. It was originally presented live on Tuesdays at 10:00PM, but later moved to Fridays. It was a 60-minute black-and-white series, running time excluding commercials is unknown. Archival status is unknown.

References

External links
Shower of Stars at IMDb

1959 Australian television series debuts
1959 Australian television series endings
Black-and-white Australian television shows
English-language television shows
Australian variety television shows
Seven Network original programming